Beat'n Groovy is a music video game developed by Japanese studio Voltex and distributed over Xbox Live Arcade. It was released on October 8, 2008. The game is based on Pop'n Music, a similarly styled arcade/PlayStation 2 game series that has not been released officially outside Japan.

Gameplay
As scrolling notes scroll down the screen, the player is to press the corresponding button on the controller, which plays a keysound which fills in part of the selected song. Players are judged on the accuracy of their hits, and a life bar on the side of the screen increases or decreases depending on their performance. The life bar must be at or over 60% at the end of the song in order to pass. The game features nine songs (ranked on a difficulty level of 1 to 9, although the hardest song is only a 3), and seven playable characters. 3-key and 5-key modes are available, with online multiplayer modes using 3-key only. An additional play mode using the Xbox Live Vision camera is also available.

Reception
IGN's Hilary Goldstien gave Beat'n Groovy a 2.0/10, critiquing the game as "poorly designed and poorly executed", and dubbing the song list as being "horrendous".

References

External links 
 

2008 video games
Konami games
Multiplayer online games
Music video games
Video games featuring female protagonists
Xbox 360 Live Arcade games
Xbox 360-only games
Multiplayer and single-player video games
Xbox 360 games
Video games developed in Japan